This is a list of the songs that reached number one in Mexico in 1979, according to Núcleo Radio Mil as published in the Billboard and Notitas Musicales magazines. Also included are the number-one songs according to the Record World magazine.

Chart history (Billboard)

Chart history (Record World)

References

Sources
Print editions of the Billboard and Record World magazines.

1979 in Mexico
Mexico
Lists of number-one songs in Mexico